La Bandida is a Mexican telenovela produced by Andrés Santamaría. The series is written by Carlos Quintanilla and Adriana Pelussi and developed by Teleset, Sony Pictures Television and Televisión Azteca. It stars Sandra Echeverría as the titular character.

Plot 
Graciela's life was not easy, she was orphaned and also became a very young widow. She started stealing, placing bets and dealing with alcohol. In this way she managed to amass a great fortune, which she invested in the creation of a dating house. Inspired by the 30s, the series will initially tell the beginning of the protagonist as a trafficker, in a role that will be played by Julieta Grajales, to subsequently present Graciela (Sandra Echeverría) in her adult stage, where most of the story will take place.

Cast 
 Sandra Echeverría as Graciela Olmos
 Julieta Grajales as Young Graciela
 Ianis Guerrero as José Hernández
 Marcia Coutiño as Sister Catalina
 Ariel López Padilla
 Albi De Abreu as Tommy Harton
 Iván Arana as Pedro Núñez
 Adrián Morales
 Alfredo Huereca as General Ordóñez 
 Fernanda Arozqueta
 Memo Villegas
 Marcelo Córdoba as Martín
 Vicky Araico as Marieta
 Antonio Fortier
 Cinthia Vázquez
 David Medel
 José Carlos Fermat
 Juan Pablo Franco
 Shaila Dúrcal
 Arantza Ruiz
 Florencia Ríos
 Gimena Gómez as La Rubia
 Jessica Ortiz
 María Gonllegos
 María del Carmen Félix

Broadcast 
The series premiered first in El Salvador on Canal 2 on 10 January 2019, although the date on which it ended and how many episodes its first broadcast was unknown. In Mexico and throughout Latin America it is available online since 1 March 2019. In Latin America (excluding United States), it premiered on 13 January 2020 on Telemundo Internacional, and the series is expected to last a total of 70 episodes on this network.

Episodes

References 

2019 telenovelas
Mexican telenovelas
2019 Mexican television series debuts
Spanish-language telenovelas
2019 Mexican television series endings
Sony Pictures Television telenovelas